William Armstrong (2 May 1886 – 29 May 1955) was an Australian cricketer. He played in five first-class matches for Queensland between 1907 and 1912.

See also
 List of Queensland first-class cricketers

References

External links
 

1880s births
1955 deaths
Australian cricketers
Queensland cricketers
Cricketers from Brisbane